HC CSKA Moscow (1946–present, Central Sports Club of the Army, Moscow) is a Russian professional ice hockey club based in Moscow.  The club is a member of the Tarasov Division in the Kontinental Hockey League (KHL). It is referred to in the West as "Central Red Army" or the "Red Army Team" for its past affiliation with the Soviet Army, popularly known as the Red Army. CSKA won more Soviet championships and European cups than any other team in history. It is owned by Russia's largest oil company, Rosneft, which is in turn majority-owned by the Russian government.

In addition to nine division titles and record six Continental Cups, CSKA has reached the Gagarin Cup Finals five times, winning in 2019 and 2022. The club also became the first one to win both the Continental Cup and the Gagarin Cup in the same season.

In 2018, after more than 50 seasons at the old Ice Palace, the team moved to a new arena, which is now called CSKA Arena, their present home arena in Moscow.

History
The club was founded in 1946 as CDKA (Centralnyy Dom Krasnoy Armii – Central House of the Red Army, referring to the Army community centre in Moscow). It was known as CDSA (with Red Army changed to Soviet Army) from 1952 – 1954, as CSK MO (Central Sports Club of the Ministry of Defense) from 1955 – 1959, and acquired its current name in 1960.

As a hockey powerhouse
CSKA won 32 Soviet regular season championships during the Soviet League's 46-year existence, far and away the most in the league's history; no other team won more than five. This included all but six from 1955 to 1989 and 13 in a row from 1977 to 1989. By comparison, no NHL team has won more than five Stanley Cups in a row since the NHL took de facto control of the trophy in 1926.

CSKA was just as dominant in the European Cup. They won all but two titles from 1969 to 1990, including 13 in a row from 1978 to 1990. The team's first coach was Anatoli Tarasov, who would later become famous as the coach of the Soviet national team. Tarasov coached the Red Army Team, either alone or with co-coaches, for most of the time from 1946 to 1975. The team's greatest run came under Viktor Tikhonov, who was coach from 1977 to 1996—serving for most of that time as coach of the national team.

The Red Army Team was able to pull off such a long run of dominance because during the Soviet era, the entire CSKA organization was a functioning division of the Soviet Armed Forces via the Ministry of Defence. As all able-bodied Soviet males had to serve in the military, the team was able to literally draft the best young hockey players in the Soviet Union onto the team. All players were commissioned officers in the Soviet Army. There was a substantial overlap between the rosters of the Red Army Team and the Soviet national team, which was one factor behind the Soviets' near-absolute dominance of international hockey from the 1950s through the early 1990s. By the late 1980s, however, the long run of Red Army dominance caused a significant dropoff in attendance throughout the league.

One of the most feared lines in hockey history was the KLM Line of the 1980s. The name came from the last names of the three players, Vladimir Krutov, Igor Larionov, and Sergei Makarov. Together with defensemen Viacheslav Fetisov and Alexei Kasatonov, they were known as the Green Unit because they wore green jerseys in practice. The five-man unit formed a dominant force in European hockey throughout the decade. All five players were later permitted to go to the NHL in 1989, with mixed results. Krutov had the shortest NHL career, lasting only one season in Vancouver; Makarov (who won the Calder Memorial Trophy in 1990) and Kasatonov were out of the NHL by 1997; Fetisov and Larionov won the Stanley Cup twice together with Detroit before Fetisov retired in 1998; Larionov would win a third Cup with Detroit in 2002, before retiring from New Jersey in 2004.

Not surprisingly, discipline was quite strict, especially under Tikhonov. His players practiced for as many as 11 months a year, and were confined to training camp (an Army barracks) most of that time even if they were married. However, it became less restrictive after the collapse of the Soviet Union.

At the IIHF Centennial All-Star Team, out of 6 players selected 4 players once played at CSKA Moscow.

CSKA and the NHL

CSKA played 36 games against NHL teams from 1975 to 1991 and finished with a record of 26 wins, 8 losses, and 2 ties. 34 of these games were played in Super Series, including the tour of North America in 1975/1976. The Super Series also introduced eventual Hockey Hall of Fame goaltender Vladislav Tretiak of the CSKA squad to North American ice hockey fans. On New Year's Eve 1975, CSKA played the Montreal Canadiens, widely regarded as the league's finest team (and that year's eventual Stanley Cup winners). The game ended with a 3–3 draw, but was widely hailed as one of the greatest games ever played.

Another memorable game was played on 11 January 1976 against the Philadelphia Flyers, who at the time were the defending Stanley Cup Champions and were known as the "Broad Street Bullies" for their highly physical play. The game was notable for an incident where, after a body check delivered by Philadelphia's Ed Van Impe, the CSKA's top player, Valeri Kharlamov (like Tretiak eventually a Hall of Famer), was left prone on the ice for a minute. CSKA coach Konstantin Loktev pulled his team off the ice in protest that no penalty was called. They were told by NHL president Clarence Campbell to return to the ice and finish the game, which was being broadcast to an international audience, or the Soviet Hockey Federation would not get paid the fee that they were entitled to. They eventually complied and lost the game 4–1.

CSKA Moscow alumni have made a large impact on the NHL. In the mid-1990s, Sergei Fedorov, Vladimir Konstantinov, and Vyacheslav Kozlov had established themselves as key members of the Detroit Red Wings when they were joined by Fetisov and Larionov, forming the Russian Five. These five players would play an integral role in the Wings' consecutive Stanley Cup championships in 1997 and 1998. Dmitri Mironov joined the 1998 squad, following Konstantinov's career-ending injury on 13 June 1997; since Konstantinov was kept on the roster despite his injury, the 1998 squad marks the largest contingent of CSKA veterans (six) to win the Stanley Cup.

|- bgcolor="#CCFFCC"
| 1 || @ New York Rangers || 7–3 || 1–0–0
|- 
| 2 || @ Montreal Canadiens || 3–3 || 1–1–0
|- bgcolor="#CCFFCC"
| 3 || @ Boston Bruins ||5–2  || 2–1–0
|- style="background:#fbb;"
| 4 || @ Philadelphia Flyers ||1–4 || 2–1–1
|-

|- bgcolor="#CCFFCC"
| 5 || @ New York Rangers ||5–2 || 3–1–1
|- bgcolor="#CCFFCC"
| 6 || @ New York Islanders ||3–2|| 4–1–1
|- style="background:#fbb;"
| 7 || @ Montreal Canadiens ||2–4 || 4–1–2
|- style="background:#fbb;"
| 8 ||  @ Buffalo Sabres ||1–6 || 4–1–3
|-bgcolor="#CCFFCC"
| 9 ||  @ Quebec Nordiques ||6–4 || 5–1–3
|-

|- bgcolor="#CCFFCC"
| 10 ||@ Los Angeles Kings ||5–2 || 6–1–3 
|- bgcolor="#CCFFCC"
| 11 || @ Edmonton Oilers  ||6–3 || 7–1–3 
|- style="background:#fbb;"
| 12 || @ Quebec Nordiques ||1–5 || 7–1–4 
|- bgcolor="#CCFFCC"
| 13 || @ Montreal Canadiens ||6–1 || 8–1–4 
|- bgcolor="#CCFFCC"
| 14 || @ St. Louis Blues ||4–2 || 9–1–4 
|- bgcolor="#CCFFCC"
| 15 || @ Minnesota North Stars ||4–3 || 10–1–4 
|-

|- bgcolor=" "
| 16 ||@ Quebec Nordiques ||5–5 || 10–2–4
|- bgcolor="#CCFFCC"
| 17 || @ New York Islanders  ||3–2 || 11–2–4 
|- bgcolor="#CCFFCC"
| 18 || @ Boston Bruins ||5–4 || 12–2–4 
|- bgcolor="#CCFFCC"
| 19 || @ New Jersey Devils ||5–0 || 13–2–4 
|- style="background:#fbb;"
| 20 || @ Pittsburgh Penguins ||2–4 || 13–2–5
|- bgcolor="#CCFFCC"
| 21 || @ Hartford Whalers ||6–3 || 14–2–5 
|- style="background:#fbb;"
| 22 || @ Buffalo Sabres ||5–6 || 14–2–6 
|- bgcolor="#CCFFCC"
| 23 || Calgary Flames ||2–1 || 15–2–6 
|-

|- style="background:#fbb;"
| 24 || @ Winnipeg Jets ||1–4 || 15–2–7
|- bgcolor="#CCFFCC"
| 25 || @ Vancouver Canucks  ||6–0 || 16–2–7 
|- bgcolor="#CCFFCC"
| 26 || @ Minnesota North Stars ||4–2 || 17–2–7 
|- bgcolor="#CCFFCC"
| 27 || @ Chicago Blackhawks ||6–4 || 18–2–7
|- bgcolor="#CCFFCC"
| 28 || @ Philadelphia Flyers ||5–4 || 19–2–7
|- bgcolor="#CCFFCC"
| 29 || Montreal Canadiens ||3–2 || 20–2–7
|-

|- bgcolor="#CCFFCC"
| 30 ||@ Detroit Red Wings ||5–2 || 21–2–7
|- bgcolor="#CCFFCC"
| 31 || @ New York Rangers  ||6–1 || 22–2–7
|- bgcolor="#CCFFCC"
| 32 || @ Chicago Blackhawks ||4–2 || 23–2–7
|- bgcolor="#CCFFCC"
| 33|| @ Calgary Flames ||6–4 || 24–2–7
|- style="background:#fbb;"
| 34 || @ Edmonton Oilers ||2–4 || 24–2–8
|- bgcolor="#CCFFCC"
| 35 || @ Winnipeg Jets ||6–4 || 25–2–8
|- bgcolor="#CCFFCC"
| 36 || @ Vancouver Canucks ||4–3 (OT)|| 26–2–8
|-

Post-Soviet history
During the late '80s and early '90s CSKA positions significantly weakened. After a conflict with Tikhonov, CSKA major stars including Fetisov, Larionov, Krutov and Makarov left the team to make their careers in the NHL. During the 90s they were followed by younger talents like Bure, Fedorov and Samsonov.

CSKA Moscow played a series of exhibitions games, and an all-star game with the American Hockey Association as part of the 1992–93 season.

For a time in the late 1990s and early 2000s, it was briefly unofficially known as "the Russian Penguins" after the Pittsburgh Penguins bought an interest in the team. The Russian Penguins played 13 games in the International Hockey League as part of the 1993–94 IHL season.

In 1996 after a conflict with management of the club, Tikhonov created his own separate team called HC CSKA that spent two seasons in the Russian Superleague and eventually reunited with the original CSKA in 2002.

In the KHL

Although CSKA has remained one of the strongest teams in Russia since the dissolution of the Soviet Union, it did not win a title in the KHL or its predecessors until 2015, when the club finished first in the regular season and became Russian champion for the first time in a long time, but failed to win the Gagarin Cup. From 2008 to 2016, the team did not advance past the conference semifinals of the Gagarin Cup playoffs; they missed the playoffs altogether in 2011. In the 2015–16 season, the team advanced all the way to the Gagarin Cup final; however, they lost that series to Metallurg Magnitogorsk in seven games. In the 2018–19 season, CSKA won its first Gagarin Cup, after beating Avangard Omsk in four games.

After the 2022 Russian invasion of Ukraine, Swedes Joakim Nordstrom and Lucas Wallmark elected to leave the team. Having lost the 2021 Gagarin Cup final to Avangard Omsk, CSKA returned to the final in 2022 to win its second Gagarin Cup against Metallurg Magnitogorsk.

Logos

Honours

Domestic competitions
 Soviet League Championship (32, record): 1947–48, 1948–49, 1949–50, 1954–55, 1955–56, 1957–58, 1958–59, 1959–60, 1960–61, 1962–63, 1963–64, 1964–65, 1965–66, 1967–68, 1969–70, 1970–71, 1971–72, 1972–73, 1974–75, 1976–77, 1977–78, 1978–79, 1979–80, 1980–81, 1981–82, 1982–83, 1983–84, 1984–85, 1985–86, 1986–87, 1987–88, 1988–89

 USSR Cup (12, record): 1954, 1955, 1956, 1961, 1966, 1967, 1968, 1969, 1973, 1977, 1979, 1988

 Vysshaya Liga Championship (1): 1996–97

 Russian Championship (4): 2014–15, 2018–19, 2019–20, 2021–22

Kontinental Hockey League
 Gagarin Cup (2): 2019, 2022

 Continental Cup (6, record): 2014–15, 2015–16, 2016–17, 2018–19, 2019–20, 2020–21

 Opening Cup (2): 2015–16, 2022–23

International
 Intercontinental Cup (1): 1971–72

 IIHF European Cup (20, record): 1969, 1970, 1971, 1972, 1973, 1974, 1976, 1978, 1979, 1980, 1981, 1982, 1983, 1984, 1985, 1986, 1987, 1988, 1989, 1990

 Spengler Cup (1): 1991

 Pajulahti Cup (1): 2005

Pre-season
 Hockeyades (Vallée de Joux) (2): 2017, 2018

 Moscow Mayor Cup (4): 2010, 2011, 2013, 2017

Season-by-season KHL record
Note: GP = Games played; W = Wins; L = Losses; OTW = Overtime/shootout wins; OTL = Overtime/shootout losses; Pts = Points; GF = Goals for; GA = Goals against

Head coaches

Until the fall of communism, all coaches held the rank of colonel in the Soviet Army.

Players

Current roster

Retired numbers
CSKA have retired four numbers in their history:

Hall-of-Famers

Players
Pavel Bure, LW, 1987–91, inducted 2012
Sergei Fedorov, C, 1986–90, inducted 2015
Viacheslav Fetisov, D, 1978–89, 2009; inducted 2001
Valeri Kharlamov, LW, 1967–81, inducted 2005
Igor Larionov, C, 1981–89, inducted 2008
Sergei Makarov, RW, 1978–89, inducted 2016
Vladislav Tretiak, G, 1968–84, inducted 1989
Sergei Zubov, D, 1988–93, inducted 2019
Builders
Anatoli Tarasov, Coach, 1947–60, 1961–70, 1970–74; inducted 1974

IIHF Hall-of-Famers

Players

Builders
Anatoli Tarasov, Coach, 1947–60, 1961–70, 1970–74; inducted 1997
Viktor Tikhonov, Coach, 1977–96, 2002–04; inducted 1998

Triple Gold Club

Players
Viacheslav Fetisov, D, 1978–89, 2009; inducted 7 June 1997, Stanley Cup win vs. Philadelphia Flyers
Alexei Gusarov, D, 1984–91, inducted 10 June 1996, Stanley Cup win vs. Florida Panthers
Valeri Kamensky, LW, 1985–91, inducted 10 June 1996, Stanley Cup win vs. Florida Panthers
Igor Larionov, C, 1981–89, inducted 7 June 1997, Stanley Cup win vs. Philadelphia Flyers
Vladimir Malakhov, D, 1988–92, inducted 10 June 2000, Stanley Cup win vs. Dallas Stars
Alexander Mogilny, RW, 1986–89, inducted 10 June 2000, Stanley Cup win vs. Dallas Stars
Pavel Datsyuk, C, 2012–13, inducted 25 February 2018, Olympic gold win vs. Germany

First round draft picks

 2009:   Mikhail Pashnin (1st overall)
 2010:   none
 2011:   Alexander Timirev (3rd overall), Mikhail Grigorenko (8th overall)
 2012:   Nikita Zadorov (4th overall), Vladislav Boiko (6th overall), Andrei Filonenko (18th overall), Sergei Tolchinsky (28th overall)
 2013:   Maxim Tretiak (12th overall), Ivan Nikolishin (29th overall)

List of CSKA players selected in the NHL Amateur Draft
 1978: Viacheslav Fetisov (Montreal Canadiens) (201st overall)

List of CSKA players selected in the NHL Entry Draft
 1982: Viktor Zhluktov (Minnesota North Stars) (143rd overall)
 1983: Vladislav Tretiak (Montreal Canadiens) (138th overall), Viacheslav Fetisov (New Jersey Devils) (145th overall), Alexei Kasatonov (New Jersey Devils) (225th overall), Sergei Makarov (Calgary Flames) (231st overall)
 1985: Igor Larionov (Vancouver Canucks) (214th overall)
 1986: Vladimir Krutov (Vancouver Canucks) (238th overall)
 1987: Igor Vyazmikin (Edmonton Oilers) (252nd overall)
 1988: Alexander Mogilny (Buffalo Sabres) (89th overall), Valeri Kamensky (Quebec Nordiques) (129th overall)
 1989: Sergei Fedorov (Detroit Red Wings) (74th overall), Pavel Bure (Vancouver Canucks) (113th overall), Sergei Starikov (New Jersey Devils) (152nd overall), Vyacheslav Bykov (Quebec Nordiques) (169th overall), Andrei Khomutov (Quebec Nordiques) (190th overall), Vladimir Konstantinov (Detroit Red Wings) (221st overall), Evgeny Davydov (Winnipeg Jets) (235th overall)
 1990: Sergei Zubov (New York Rangers) (85th overall), Vyacheslav Butsayev (Philadelphia Flyers) (109th overall), Andrei Kovalenko (Quebec Nordiques) (148th overall)
 1991: Igor Kravchuk (Chicago Blackhawks) (71st overall), Dmitri Motkov (Detroit Red Wings) (98th overall), Oleg Petrov (Montreal Canadiens) (127th overall), Evgeny Belosheikin (Edmonton Oilers) (232nd overall)
 1992: Sergei Krivokrasov (Chicago Blackhawks) (12th overall), Boris Mironov (Winnipeg Jets) (27th overall), Dmitri Starostenko (New York Rangers) (120th overall), Artur Oktyabrev (Winnipeg Jets) (155th overall)
 1993: Alexander Osadchy (San Jose Sharks) (80th overall), Yuri Yuresko (Detroit Red Wings) (178th overall), Dmitri Gorenko (Hartford Whalers) (214th overall)
 1994: Alexander Kharlamov (Washington Capitals) (15th overall), Alexei Krivchenkov (Pittsburgh Penguins) (76th overall), Valentin Morozov (Pittsburgh Penguins) (154th overall), Alexei Lazarenko (New York Rangers) (182nd overall), Boris Zelenko (Pittsburgh Penguins) (206th overall)
 1995: Oleg Belov (Pittsburgh Penguins) (102nd overall), Vasili Turkovsky (Washington Capitals) (199th overall)
 1996: Andrei Petrunin (Hartford Whalers) (61st overall), Oleg Kvasha (Florida Panthers) (65th overall), Dmitri Subbotin (New York Rangers) (76th overall), Nikolai Ignatov (Tampa Bay Lightning) (152nd overall), Denis Khloptonov (Florida Panthers) (209th overall), Denis Khloptonov (Florida Panthers) (209th overall)
 1997: Denis Timofeyev (Boston Bruins) (135th overall), Denis Martynyuk (Vancouver Canucks) (135th overall)
 1998: Alexander Zevakhin (Pittsburgh Penguins) (54th overall)
 1999: Alexander Buturlin (Montreal Canadiens) (39th overall), Alexander Chagodayev (Mighty Ducks of Anaheim) (105th overall), Vladimir Kulkov (Toronto Maple Leafs) (211st overall), Maxim Orlov (Washington Capitals) (219th overall), Dimitri Kirilenko Calgary Flames (252nd overall)
 2000: Anton Volchenkov (Ottawa Senators) (21st overall), Vasily Bizyayev (Buffalo Sabres) (213th overall)
 2002: Sergei Anshakov (Los Angeles Kings) (50th overall), Vladislav Evseev (Boston Bruins) (56th overall), Dmitri Kazionov (Tampa Bay Lightning) (100th overall), Viktor Bobrov (Calgary Flames) (146th overall), Sergei Mozyakin (Columbus Blue Jackets) (263rd overall)
 2003: Nikolay Zherdev (Columbus Blue Jackets) (fourth overall), Andrei Kostitsyn (Montreal Canadiens) (10th overall), Dmitri Kosmachev (Columbus Blue Jackets) (71st overall), Rustam Sidikov (Nashville Predators) (133rd overall), Andrei Mukhachev (Nashville Predators) (210th overall)
 2004: Kirill Lyamin (Ottawa Senators) (58th overall), Denis Parshin (Colorado Avalanche) (72nd overall), Alexander Nikulin (Ottawa Senators) (122nd overall)
 2005: Viktor Dovgan (Washington Capitals) (209th overall), Nikolay Lemtyugov (St. Louis Blues) (219th overall)
 2006: Vladimir Zharkov (New Jersey Devils) (77th overall), Sergei Shirokov (Vancouver Canucks) (163rd overall), Arturs Kulda (Atlanta Thrashers) (200th overall)
 2007: Maxim Goncharov (Phoenix Coyotes) (123rd overall), Ilya Kablukov (Vancouver Canucks) (146th overall)
 2008: Nikita Filatov (Columbus Blue Jackets) (sixth overall), Dmitri Kugryshev (Washington Capitals) (58th overall)
 2011: Nikita Kucherov (Tampa Bay Lightning) (58th overall), Alexei Marchenko (Detroit Red Wings) (205th overall)
 2012: Nikolai Prokhorkin (Los Angeles Kings) (121st overall), Nikita Gusev (Tampa Bay Lightning) (202nd overall)
 2016: Maxim Mamin (Florida Panthers) (175th overall)
 2017: Andrei Svetlakov (Minnesota Wild) (178th overall)
 2018: Alexander Romanov (Montreal Canadiens) (38th overall)

Stanley Cup Winners
Players

Builders
Vyacheslav Fetisov, Assistant coach, 1978–89, 2009, won 2000

Note: Only counts if the players or builders have played for CSKA before the NHL.

Olympic Champions

Players

Builders
Anatoly Tarasov, Coach, 1947–60, 1961–70, 1970–74, champion 1964, 1968, 1972
Viktor Tikhonov, Coach, 1977–96, 2002–04, champion 1984, 1988, 1992
Igor Nikitin, Coach, 2014–21, champion 2018

Canada Cup Winners

Players

Builders
Viktor Tikhonov, Coach, 1977–96, 2002–04, won 1981

NHL Awards
Hart Trophy (NHL MVP)
Sergei Fedorov, C, 1986–90, 1993–94 
Lady Byng Memorial Trophy
Alexander Mogilny, RW, 1986–89, 2002–03
Calder Memorial Trophy
Pavel Bure, LW, 1987–91, 1991–92
Sergei Makarov, RW, 1978–89, 1989–90
Sergei Samsonov, LW, 1994–96, 1997–98
Kirill Kaprizov, LW, 2017–20, 2020–21
Ted Lindsay Award
Sergei Fedorov, C, 1986–90, 1993–94
Frank J. Selke Trophy
Sergei Fedorov, C, 1986–90, 1993–94, 1995–96
NHL Plus-Minus Award
Vladimir Konstantinov, D, 1984–91, 1995–96
Maurice "Rocket" Richard Trophy
Pavel Bure, LW, 1987–91, 1999–00, 2000–01

Note: Only counts if the players or builders played in the CSKA before the NHL.

All-Star game

NHL All-Star Game
Players

Note: Only counts if the players or builders has played in the CSKA before NHL.

KHL All-Star Game
Players
Konstantin Barulin, G, 2008–10, 2009
Pavel Datsyuk, C, 2012–13, 2013
Denis Denisov, D, 1996–97, 2012–17, 2014
Mikhail Grabovski, C, 2012–13, 2013
Konstantin Korneyev, D, 2006–10, 2009, 2010
Denis Parshin, LW, 2003–12, 2010
Nikolai Prokhorkin, LW, 2010–12, 2012–15, 2014
Alexander Radulov, RW, 2012–16, 2013, 2014 
Oleg Saprykin, LW, 2004–05, 2007–09, 2009
Sergei Shirokov, RW, 2004–09, 2011–13, 2012
Builders
Vyacheslav Bykov, Assistant Coach, 2004–09, 2009
Igor Zakharkin, Assistant Coach, 2008–09, 2009

Franchise scoring leaders
These are the top-ten-point-scorers in franchise history. Figures are updated after each completed Soviet/CIS/IHL/RUS 2/RSL/KHL regular season.

''Note: Pos = Position; GP = Games played; G = Goals; A = Assists; Pts = Points; P/G = Points per game

Awards and trophies
Soviet / Russian MVP

Scoring Champion

Goal Scoring Champion

Soviet / Russian League First Team

Best Line

Best Rookie

See also

References

External links
  

 
Ice hockey teams in Russia
Ice hockey clubs established in 1946
Kontinental Hockey League teams
1946 establishments in the Soviet Union
HC
Military ice hockey teams